James Giles may refer to:
James Giles (porcelain decorator) (1718–1780)
James Giles (painter) (1801–1870), Scottish painter
James Giles (politician), Australian politician
James Giles (philosopher) (born 1958), Canadian philosopher and psychologist
James Bascom Giles or Bascom Giles (1900–1993), American politician
James LeRoy Giles (1863–1946), mayor of Orlando
James T. Giles (born 1943), U.S. federal judge

See also
Jim Giles (disambiguation)